Ustadon Ke Ustad may refer to:

 Ustadon Ke Ustad (1963 film)
 Ustadon Ke Ustad (1998 film)